Armend Halili (born 22 June 1997) is a Kosovan professional footballer who plays as a left-back for KF Gjilani.

Club career
Halili signed a contract with the football club KF Gjilani on 6 July 2018.

Halili was selected in the formation of the 2021–22 autumn season in the position of centre-back in the Football Superleague of Kosovo.

References

External links
 

SC Gjilani players
1997 births
Living people
Sportspeople from Pristina
Kosovo Albanians
Kosovan footballers
Association football fullbacks
Kosovo youth international footballers
Football Superleague of Kosovo players
KF KEK players
Kategoria Superiore players
Kosovan expatriate footballers
Kosovan expatriate sportspeople in Albania
Expatriate footballers in Albania